Nazra Naseem alias Nazu Naseem (born 3 May 1989) is a Maldivian politician and chief executive of Maldives vice president Faisal Naseem.

Early life and education
Nazra Naseem was born in 1989 at Fuvahmulah. She did her bachelor's in international hospitality management from Taylor's University Malaysia and received an MBA degree from University of the West of England, Bristol.

Career
Nazra started actively engaged in politics when her husband Ahmed Mahloof was jailed.

Personal life
Nazra Naseem is married to Ahmed Mahloof, the youngest Maldivian Cabinet Minister of Youth, Sports, and Community Empowerment. Ahmed Mahloof became the youngest man to be appointed as a cabinet minister at the age of 38 years.

See also
Ahmed Mahloof
 Faisal Naseem

References

Maldivian politicians
1989 births
Living people